"Quite Miss Home" is a song by British singer-songwriter James Arthur. It was released as a digital download and for streaming on 18 October 2019, as the seventh and final single from Arthur's third studio album, You. The song was written by Leland, Michael Pollack, Ryan Daly, Busbee and James Arthur.
The music video of this song, is dedicated to Busbee, who helped to produce and write this song.

Live performances
On 2 November 2019, Arthur performed the song live during the live shows of The X Factor: Celebrity.

Charts and certifications

Certifications

Release history

References

2019 songs
James Arthur songs
Songs written by James Arthur
Songs written by Leland (musician)
Songs written by busbee
2019 singles
Songs written by Michael Pollack (musician)